Ahmed Mohamed Abou El Fotouh Mohamed (born 22 March 1998), simply known as Ahmed Fatouh, is an Egyptian footballer who plays for Egyptian Premier League side Zamalek and the Egyptian national team as a left-back.

Fatouh featured in the 2021 Africa Cup of Nations Final against Senegal.

International goals 
Scores and results list Egypt's goal tally first.

Honours

Club
Zamalek

Egyptian Premier League 2020-21, 2021-22

Egypt Cup: 2017–18 ,2021

Egypt
Africa U-23 Cup of Nations Champions: 2019

References

1998 births
Living people
Egyptian footballers
Egypt youth international footballers
Egypt international footballers
Association football defenders
Egyptian Premier League players
Zamalek SC players
ENPPI SC players
Smouha SC players
Footballers at the 2020 Summer Olympics
Olympic footballers of Egypt
2021 Africa Cup of Nations players